The Salang Pass (Kutal-i Salang, el. ) is the primary mountain pass connecting northern Afghanistan with Parwan Province, with onward connections to Kabul Province, southern Afghanistan, and to the Pakistani province of Khyber Pakhtunkhwa. Located on the border of Parwan Province and Baghlan Province, it is just to the East of the Kushan Pass, and both of them were of great importance in early times as they provided the most direct connections between the Kabul region with northern Afghanistan or Tokharistan. The Salang River originates nearby and flows south.

The pass crosses the Hindu Kush mountains but is now bypassed through the Salang Tunnel, which runs underneath it at a height of about 3,400 m. The tunnel was built by engineers and construction crews from the Soviet Union in 1958 – 1964 as part of a wide-ranging infrastructure build out in Afghanistan carried out by the USSR. During the Afghan civil war it was blown up in 1997 by forces of Ahmad Shah Massoud in order to prevent Taliban fighters from coming through it. In 2002 the Russian Ministry Of Emergency Situations (RMES) organized the work to rebuild the tunnel and the repairs were completed within a month.

It links Charikar and Kabul in the South with Mazar-i-Sharif and Kunduz in the North. Before the road and tunnel were built, the main route between Kabul and northern Afghanistan was via the Shibar Pass, a much longer route which took three days.

The road through the pass has carried heavy military traffic in recent conflicts and is in very bad repair.

February 2010 avalanches 

On February 9, 2010, the pass was hit by multiple avalanches. According to press reports the road through the pass was hit by 17 avalanches, killing dozens, burying miles of highway, and trapping the vehicles in the Salang tunnel.
By February 10, 2010, authorities had recovered over 160 bodies. Radio Free Europe reported the first avalanche blocked the tunnel, and trapped vehicles in a traffic jam in a "deadly avalanche zone".

Gallery

See also 
 Khost-Gardez Pass
 Wakhjir Pass
 Khyber Pass
 Khojak Pass
 North Salang, nearby village
 List of mountain passes

References

External links

Mountain passes of Afghanistan
Landforms of Baghlan Province
Landforms of Kabul Province
Landforms of Parwan Province